Heterocaryum is a genus of flowering plants belonging to the family Boraginaceae.

Its native range is Southern European Russia to Central Asia and Pakistan.

Species:

Heterocaryum echinophorum 
Heterocaryum × irregulare 
Heterocaryum laevigatum

References

Boraginoideae
Boraginaceae genera